Étienne Jalenques (born 10 December 1934) is a French modern pentathlete. He competed at the 1960 Summer Olympics.

References

1934 births
Living people
French male modern pentathletes
Olympic modern pentathletes of France
Modern pentathletes at the 1960 Summer Olympics
Sportspeople from Paris